Carly Robyn Green, born Carly Greenberg, is an American recording artist and songwriter originally from Philadelphia, Pennsylvania.  Her original songs have been featured in over 120 television shows and films and she writes for artists worldwide.  She is signed to BMG.

Biography 

As an adult-contemporary / smooth jazz artist and performer, Green has performed at venues including the Staples Center, Madison Square Garden, Wachovia Center, Citizens Bank Park, and the Tropicana Hotel & Casino. Green has performed for MTV’s Rock the Vote, debuted on XM Satellite Radio, been named a MySpace Featured Artist, and signed with BMG as artist and songwriter.

After being told to create trendy “of the moment” music for many years, Green was inspired by CeeLo Green to follow her passion for making classic, timeless music.  When she sang with him at the 49th Annual Grammy Awards, he advised Green to just “do what you love.”

As a result of this advice, Green collaborated on her own project of classic love songs with Broadway composer Frank Wildhorn, who penned hits for Whitney Houston and Natalie Cole.  Green’s new project of original love songs features her debut single What Love is All About, co-written with Wildhorn and released in 2017.

Green grew up in Philadelphia, Pennsylvania. She graduated magna cum laude from the University of Pennsylvania.

Songwriting credits 
As a songwriter, Green has written many hits for multi-platinum artists worldwide, including:
 Sandra N – “Tu Esti Norocul” – Single – Roton Music  Petra Filip,
 KARA – “N.E.V.E.R.L.A.N.D.” – “Girl’s Story” Album – Universal Music Japan
 Anri – “Ready to Love” – Single & “Smooth & Groove” Album – IVY Records/Warner Music Japan
 Min Hae – “You & Me” – Single & "You & Me" Album – CJ E&M

She has also written songs for Airspoken, Starmarie, Code V, Miho Fukuhara, Harajuku Theater, Kaho, Aycan, and Roser.

Television and film 

Some of the many TV shows featuring music by Green include: 3Scandal (ABC), One Life to Live (ABC), Hung (HBO), Young & The Restless (CBS), Real Housewives (BRAVO), Beauty & The Beast (The CW), Keeping Up with the Kardashians (E!), Degrassi (Teen Nick), The Real World (MTV), Say Yes to the Dress (TLC), The Real L Word (Showtime)

Green wrote the Dance Moms hit I'll Be Your Dance Doctor by 21st Century Girl, performed by Mackenzie Ziegler in the Nationals season finale.

Green also wrote the 30 Rock song Crash Your Party, featured in the Martin Luther King Day viral spoof trailer.

TV show theme songs by Green include: I Do Over (WeTV), Pretty Hurts (Logo), The Right Hand (The Movie Network)

Films featuring music by Green include: American Girl: McKenna Shoots for the Stars, Slightly Single in LA, Life Happens, House Bunny, What’s Your Number, A Wish For Christmas, Love on Ice

References

External links

American women singer-songwriters
University of Pennsylvania alumni
Year of birth missing (living people)
Living people
Musicians from Philadelphia
21st-century American women
Singer-songwriters from Pennsylvania